West Elmira is a suburban census-designated place (CDP) in Chemung County, New York, United States. The population was 4,967 at the 2010 census. It is adjacent to the city of Elmira on its west side. West Elmira is in the southwest part of the town of Elmira. It is part of the Elmira Metropolitan Statistical Area.

Geography
West Elmira is located at  (42.082974, -76.844046).

West Elmira is on the north bank of the Chemung River.

New York State Route 352 enters the village from the west as Water Street. East of York Avenue, Water Street carries eastbound traffic while Church Street carries westbound traffic.

Demographics

As of the census of 2000, there were 5,136 people, 2,161 households, and 1,504 families residing in the community. The population density was 1,705.3 per square mile (658.8/km2). There were 2,266 housing units at an average density of 752.4/sq mi (290.7/km2). The racial makeup of the CDP was 95.91% White, 1.83% African American, 0.08% Native American, 1.44% Asian, 0.18% from other races, and 0.56% from two or more races. Hispanic or Latino of any race were 0.51% of the population.

There were 2,161 households, out of which 29.2% had children under the age of 18 living with them, 59.5% were married couples living together, 7.7% had a female householder with no husband present, and 30.4% were non-families. 27.3% of all households were made up of individuals, and 15.9% had someone living alone who was 65 years of age or older. The average household size was 2.37 and the average family size was 2.87.

In the area the population was spread out, with 23.2% under the age of 18, 5.0% from 18 to 24, 23.4% from 25 to 44, 27.9% from 45 to 64, and 20.7% who were 65 years of age or older. The median age was 44 years. For every 100 females, there were 87.8 males. For every 100 females age 18 and over, there were 82.8 males.

The median income for a household in the area was $53,577, and the median income for a family was $66,705. Males had a median income of $40,746 versus $33,929 for females. The per capita income for the CDP was $28,376. About 3.6% of families and 5.7% of the population were below the poverty line, including 9.6% of those under age 18 and 0.6% of those age 65 or over.

References

Census-designated places in New York (state)
Census-designated places in Chemung County, New York